Goosebumps is a children's anthology horror television series based on R. L. Stine's best-selling book series of the same name. It is an anthology of stories about tweens and young teens finding themselves in creepy and unusual situations, typically involving supernatural elements or the occult.

Production
Goosebumps was filmed largely in the Canadian province of Ontario, with different houses and historic properties in Toronto, Markham and other outlying rural areas serving often as the sets for each episode rather than constructing artificial houses and buildings. Canada also provided a more affordable filming location and an aesthetic that could double as American while maintaining ambiguity in terms of location and setting. Props for the series were designed by Ron Stefaniuk and Alan Doucette, while Stefaniuk retained many of the animatronic props at his own studio after Goosebumps was cancelled.

Episodes

Broadcast history

Goosebumps originally began airing on YTV (in English) and Canal Famille (in French) in Canada. Since 2022,  Family started airing reruns.

In other countries, Fox Kids in Australia in 1995 and on Fox Kids in the United States starting on 27 October 1995 and ending on 16 November 1998, with reruns on Fox Family lasting until 6 September 1999 and 3 September 2001 respectively. Every October from 2007 to 2009, Cartoon Network aired the episodes. From 6 September 2011 until 5 October 2014, The Hub broadcast the series. From 2013 onwards, Netflix has streamed all 74 episodes of the TV series on its online streaming service. In the UK, it aired on Children's BBC from 1997-1999, with repeats aired until 2001.

Marketing 

To coincide with Fox's release of several tapes from the series, a Halloween 1998 tie-in marketing campaign with General Mills promoted the video series on 10 million packages and included with each videocassette coupons for products like Fruit Roll-Ups and Gushers.

Reception 

Some of the VHS releases were among the best-selling children's videos in November 1998, according to Billboard.

Home media

VHS releases

United Kingdom

United States

DVD releases
Beginning in 2004, 20th Century Fox Home Entertainment began releasing the series on DVD in individual volumes, containing one two part episode per disc but later changed sometimes two separate episodes per disc. Later releases included either two discs or multiple episodes on one disc.

Original releases
(With two episodes per disc, except for Chillogy):

Double features
On 16 September 2008, twelve of the above sixteen discs were re-released in new double-feature sets, containing the same episodes as before.

Revival releases
Starting in 2008, new DVD sets were released to coincide with the Goosebumps HorrorLand revival books. These DVD's were a big upgrade from the previous releases, with menus and enhanced audio and picture quality Unlike the original releases, these sets include three to four 22-minute episodes, instead of two. They also feature new cover art, as opposed to previous releases which used the cover art for the corresponding series book. Many of the previously released titles have been re-released as well, but only new releases are included in this list. Out of all of these DVD releases, 69 out of the 74 episodes have been released on DVD in the United States, excluding the Haunted Mask parts 1 and 2 Werewolf Skin parts 1 and 2 and the Cuckoo Clock of Doom. The Haunted Mask and Werewolf Skin however were previously released on VHS.

Season sets
On 26 November 2012, Revelation Films started to release season sets of the series in the United Kingdom (DVD region 2). These releases largely contained the episodes' mostly uncensored versions as seen on Fox Kids (albeit still truncating the ending of "A Shocker on Shock Street"); a description on the back of the case mentions the heavy censoring they were subjected to when they aired on CBBC. All six hour-long specials from across the first and second seasons are also included in their entirety, rather then being split into two-part episodes.

On 2 April 2014, Madman Entertainment released the entire series in four DVD sets as well as a "Most Wanted Collection" in Australia and New Zealand (DVD region 4).

Online
 The complete series is now on iTunes.
 The series is available for streaming on Netflix (United States, United Kingdom, and Canada).

Goosebumps Presents
The books in the original Goosebumps series that were made into episodes of the Goosebumps television series were subsequently re-released in a series called Goosebumps Presents. The main difference between the books in this series and their original publications is that the Goosebumps Presents editions contained photos from the corresponding episodes. Eighteen books were released from 1996 to 1998.

Reboot

On 28 April 2020, it was announced that a reboot live action TV series was in the works by Scholastic Entertainment, Sony Pictures Television Studios and Neal H. Moritz's production company Original Film who produced both the 2015 film and its sequel. In March 2021, R.L. Stine had stated that the series had found a producer and a director. In February 2022, it was announced that the series will be heading to Disney+. It was also revealed that the series will not follow the anthology format of the first Goosebumps series, but will instead be a 10 episode series with a storyline inspired by the films that follows a group of five high schoolers who unleash supernatural forces upon their town and must all work together – thanks to and in spite of their friendships, rivalries, and pasts with each other – in order to save it, learning much about their own parents’ teenage secrets in the process.

See also

 Are You Afraid of the Dark?
 The Nightmare Room
 The Haunting Hour: The Series

References

Further reading

External links
  at Scholastic Press
 

1990s American science fiction television series
1990s American anthology television series
1990s American children's television series
1990s American horror television series
1995 American television series debuts
1998 American television series endings
1990s Canadian science fiction television series
1990s Canadian anthology television series
1990s Canadian children's television series
1995 Canadian television series debuts
1998 Canadian television series endings
American children's fantasy television series
American children's horror television series
American television shows based on children's books
American television shows featuring puppetry
American horror fiction television series
Canadian children's fantasy television series
Canadian children's horror television series
Canadian television shows based on children's books
Canadian television shows featuring puppetry
Canadian horror fiction television series
Dark fantasy television series
English-language television shows
Fox Kids
Fox Broadcasting Company original programming
YTV (Canadian TV channel) original programming
Goosebumps
Television series by Hyperion Pictures
Television series by 9 Story Media Group
Television series by Saban Entertainment
Television shows filmed in Toronto